Crown Jewels is a 1950 West German crime film directed by Franz Cap and starring  Sybille Schmitz, Hans Nielsen and Kurt Kreuger.

It was shot at the Bavaria Studios in Munich. The film's sets were designed by the art director Hans Kuhnert.

Synopsis
When a country is invaded, its crown jewels are hidden from the occupiers. Various figures try to get their hands on them.

Cast
 Sybille Schmitz  as Eva Skeravenen
 Hans Nielsen  as Willroy
 Kurt Kreuger  as Paul Regner
 Marina von Ditmar  as Helen Fabricius
 Annemarie Holtz  as Frau Fabricius
 Rolf von Nauckhoff as Minister
 Herta Worell  as Mimi
 Wolfgang Büttnera s Scaliger
 John Pauls-Harding  as Charly
 Gerd Brüdern  as Benjamin
 Fritz Wagner  as Georges
 Hannes Keppler as Kommissar
 Udo Loeptin as Prosecutor
 Karl-Heinz Peters as Lidell
 Herbert Kroll
 Käthe Vanden
 Kurt Stieler
 Ernst Fritz Fürbringer
 Fritz Odemar
 Hildegard Busse
 Ulrich Folkmar  as Richter
 Alice Verden

References

Bibliography

External links 
 

1950 films
1950 crime films
German crime films
West German films
1950s German-language films
Films directed by František Čáp
Films shot at Bavaria Studios
Bavaria Film films
German black-and-white films
1950s German films